Museu Rainha Dona Leonor ("Queen Eleanor Museum") is a museum housed in the former Convent of Beja, Portugal.

Convent
The convent was founded in 1495. The convent of Nossa Senhora da Conceição, a congregation of Poor Clares in Beja, was the setting for the romance between nun Mariana Alcoforado and a French officer, as retold in Mariana (1997) and other novels.

It serves now as the Beja Regional Museum.

References

External links
Official website

Museums in Portugal
National monuments in Beja District